Ghana Town  is a small coastal fishing town in western Gambia. It is located in Kombo North/Saint Mary District in the Western Division.  As of 2009, it has an estimated population of 1, 397.

Ghana town was established in the Gambia in the year 1961 by fishermen from the Ghana who wanted to go fishing in Senegal but later ended in Gambia.

References

Populated places in the Gambia